Brinsworth Academy (formerly Brinsworth Comprehensive School) is a mixed secondary school and sixth form located in Brinsworth, South Yorkshire, England.

History
As Brinsworth Comprehensive School it was previously awarded specialist Science College status. The school became an academy in October 2010. It changed its name from Brinsworth Comprehensive School to Brinsworth Academy on 1 September 2015.

Ofsted inspections
Since the commencement of Ofsted inspections in September 1993, the school has undergone six inspections:

Headteachers
 Mr Richard Fone, 2008–December 2015
 Mr Barsby and Mr Riches (co-headteachers), January 2016–present

Notable pupils
Howard Webb, football referee who officiated the 2010 FIFA World Cup Final

References

External links
 Brinsworth Academy
 "Brinsworth Comprehensive School", Department for Education report.

Secondary schools in Rotherham
Academies in Rotherham